Tankerton Halt was a minor station on the Canterbury and Whitstable Railway at Tankerton, Kent. It opened in 1914 and closed in 1931.

History
Tankerton Halt was opened on 1 July 1914. It was located immediately north of the point where the Canterbury and Whitstable Railway crossed the Faversham–Margate line. A footpath connected it with the nearby  station. The halt was provided with a small building which served as a ticket office. Lighting was by gas. The entire structure was built of wood. The halt closed on 1 January 1931, when passenger services ceased on the Canterbury and Whitstable Railway. The station was demolished after closure and the site is now undeveloped.

References
Citations

Sources
 
 
 

Disused railway stations in Kent
Former South Eastern Railway (UK) stations
Railway stations in Great Britain opened in 1914
Railway stations in Great Britain closed in 1931
Whitstable
1914 establishments in England
1931 disestablishments in England